Squirrel and G-Man Twenty Four Hour Party People Plastic Face Carnt Smile (White Out) is the debut studio album by English rock band Happy Mondays. It was released in mid-April 1987 through Factory Records. After finalising their line-up, the band began playing local venues in Manchester, toured with New Order, and released an EP and a single in 1985. Happy Mondays' debut album was recorded at Fire House in London in December 1986, with producer John Cale. Halfway through the two weeks of sessions, they scrapped all recordings and started again. Cale and engineer Dave Young both did not understand the band members' vision for the album, finding them difficult to work with. The band sought to incorporate funk rhythms with a "spacious, trippy" sound, and most of its songs were made up akin to stories featured on The Twilight Zone.

Squirrel and G-Man Twenty Four Hour Party People Plastic Face Carnt Smile (White Out) received generally positive reviews from music critics, some liked Happy Mondays' musicianship, while others were indifferent to Cale's production. It sold 3,500 copies with its six months of release. "Tart Tart" was released as the lead single from the album in March 1987. It earned the band national exposure when its music video was played on Channel 4's The Chart Show. Over the next five months, the band played various headlining shows and supporting slots for a number of bands. The most notable of these were two dates supporting New Order, one of which was an all-day benefit gig hosted by Factory Records. "24 Hour Party People" was released as the album's second single in October 1987.

Background
At age 16, Shaun Ryder left education in 1978, acquiring a job with his father at a post office. Two years later, he formed a band with his brother Paul Ryder on bass, their cousin Matt Carroll on guitar and the Ryders' father's drum machine. Paul Ryder joined Shaun at the post office after finishing his education. In 1981, Mark Day began working at the same post office, and quickly joined the band on guitar. As the band were rehearsing in Day's attic by early 1982, they went by the name Something in the Attic. After a few more rehearsals, Carroll left, not before giving the band their new name of Avant-Garde. Shaun Ryder learned of drummer Gary Whelan through his fiancé's sister; she and Day independently asked Whelan to join them. By the end of 1982, the band – now named Penguin Dice – were writing original material. In early 1983, the name was changed to Happy Laws, and eventually to Happy Mondays.

During one conversation, Happy Mondays talked about Whelan's schoolmate Paul Davis, who Ryder used to see around the neighbourhood. Davis attended a few rehearsals, before joining the band on keyboards. Following an encounter at a club, Phil Saxe became the band's manager. Over the next 18 months, the band would frequently perform at venues across Manchester such as The Boardwalk and The International, and supported New Order on the final date of their tour of the United Kingdom in January 1985. Saxe met Mike Pickering, who was working as A&R for Factory Records, and told him about Happy Mondays. Factory founder Tony Wilson, alongside directors Rob Gretton and Alan Erasmus, subsequently saw the band at The Haçienda; the trio were impressed. Happy Mondays released their debut EP Forty Five EP, produced by Pickering, on Factory in September 1985.

Happy Mondays met Mark "Bez" Berry through mutual friend Little Mini; Bez had previously attended school with Davis, Day and Whelan. At the band's next gig, Bez was invited to dance on stage with him as Ryder had a bad acid trip earlier that evening. Shaun Ryder befriended Terry Hall, who he knew from the latter's work with the Specials and Fun Boy Three. Ryder and the rest of Happy Mondays (with Bez in tow) supported Hall on tour with his newest outfit the Colourfield, observing that band's stage presence in an attempt to improve their own. Happy Mondays' next single, the Bernard Sumner-produced "Freaky Dancin'", was released in June 1986. It saw wah wah guitar over a backbeat, which could become the band's core sound moving forward. During a promotional shoot while making the song, Bez graduated from being the band's friend to officially becoming their percussionist and dancer.

Recording
Vini Reilly of labelmates the Durutti Column was being touted as the producer for Happy Mondays' upcoming debut album. The band, however, wanted to enlist Sumner again; he took a temporary break from producing to focus on New Order's Brotherhood (1986). Sumner had worked on remixes for other acts, and had mixed From the Hip (1984) by Section 25; both projects he felt were too energy consuming, and felt his efforts were best spent working with New Order. Sumner was also concerned that he would accidentally make Happy Mondays sound closer in style to the work of New Order. Wilson, who shifted his focus to new signees the Railway Children and Miaow, had suggested Reilly despite reservations about the Happy Mondays' debut. Reilly met the band and was dismayed by their attitude, and criticised Day's guitar playing. Ryder said he was initially brought in to produce "Freaky Dancin'" before Sumner, but "only lasted about two hours before he decided he couldn't handle us". Wilson searched through his record collection to find a suitable producer for Happy Mondays' debut album. After comparing Ryder's lyrics with those by Patti Smith, Wilson thought of John Cale, who had produced Smith and was a member of the Velvet Underground.

Wilson theorised that if the album was a poor seller upon release, it would be ensured steady sales in the years that followed by virtue of having Cale's name attached to it. At the same time, Saxe saw Happy Mondays as Manchester's answer to New York's the Velvet Underground. Concerned that Wilson would not accept the idea of Cale as the producer, Saxe asked Sumner to suggest it on his behalf. Wilson knew Cale as he previously appeared on Wilson's So It Goes programme for Granada Television. Happy Mondays recorded at Fire House in London over two weeks in December 1986. Cale picked the studio as he had previously been in a band with the owner, Dave Young. The sessions cost £6,000 and were produced by Cale, while Young served as engineer, with assistance from Zuni and Andy Kelly.

Factory set them up in a shared house in Belsize Park, with the band living in one room, and electricians and builders living in the other rooms. As Day was the only member with a full-time job by this point, he was able to afford food while the rest of the band resorted to stealing to be fed. The first two days consisted of playing the songs for Cale, who was impressed with Day's skills. After the first week was up, they scrapped any performances they had captured up to that point, and started again. Young was bewildered by the band's performances, remarking that the members did not seem to know what they playing a lot of the time. Cale found it difficult to work with Ryder; he liked Ryder's voice but was unable to follow the lyrics. Ryder wrote his words on pieces of scrap paper and then binned them, leaving Cale unable to see if they could be improved upon. A lot of his vocal takes included ad-libs, which made it hard if they wanted to re-do a specific line, with Ryder even claiming he forgotten what he sang moments prior.

After recording "Little Matchstick Owen", the band wanted to make a rap version of it, to which Pickering suggested enlisting London-based Three Wise Men. Before this came to fruition, the studio's window cleaner said he could rap, much to the surprise of the band. Mike Bleach subsequently rapped over this new version, which was then renamed to "Little Matchstick Owen's Rap". Wilson subsequently regretted having Cale as he "didn't have a fucking clue what was going on", not understanding the members themselves or their vision for the album. Ryder was the only member of the band who was aware of Cale's previous work; despite this, he did not wish to waste "weeks in some studio grafting away, fuck that". Wilson had attempted to visit the band during recording, but was unable to locate the studio. He regretted not being able to as he was subsequently disappointed with the final recordings, feeling "stunned by how incredibly lame the songs were [... it] sounded really thin and amateur". Ryder said that Cale captured "pretty much" how the band sounded during their live shows, "he didn't do much" to enhance their performances. Cale was struggling with sobriety and took to it by eating tangerines; the band complained that all Cale would do was sit around and eat the fruit.

Composition and lyrics

Overview
Musically, the sound of Squirrel and G-Man Twenty Four Hour Party People Plastic Face Carnt Smile (White Out) has been described as mixing the punk-funk of ESG with the atmosphere of Joy Division. Classic Pop Mag described its sound as "rough-around-the-edges funky post-punk." In his biography of the band, Shaun Ryder: Happy Mondays, Black Grape & Other Traumas, author Mick Middles referred to album as: "A thousand nights, drunk on funk, dull thuds and a wandering bass, [with] a wholly intoxicated [...] sound". It features many characteristics that would be further developed on the band's second studio album Bummed (1988), such as Ryder's seemingly nonsensical lyrics combined with funk rhythms. Ryder said house music was seeping into the club nights that the members visited, though the band was unable to bring that influence into their songs as he felt they were not competent musicians. Ryder attributed the various pauses in the songs as they attempted to emulate the music of the Doors. In hindsight, he said it could be viewed as latter-day indie rock: "At the time, indie [rock] meant, tight, fast, neat music" while the band sought to have a "really spacious, trippy sound". 

During their live performances, the members would unintentionally play songs for longer than necessary, as Ryder said they "could never get the timing right to end a song together". As a result of this, he would have to freestyle lyrics over these extended versions; an unintended consequence of this meant new songs would evolve out of the freestyles. They would record the shows and work on material during practice sessions. The album's title is partially the result of Little Mini. He visited them, took one look, and exclaimed: "Fucking hell, twenty-four hour party people, plastic people  smile a white out..." The eventual full title consisted of various references: Squirrel is the nickname for Davis' mother, G-Man alludes to Bez's father being a cop, Twenty Four Hour Party People is a synonym for the band, and Plastic Face and Carnt Smile were two truncated Salford expressions meaning "miserable bastards".  Ryder considered the sentence a joke, before liking the sound of it as an album title, as the expression "[k]ind of summed the whole thing up".

Songs
Ryder said the majority of the song' lyrics were crafted together "like short stories from The Twilight Zone". The title of "Kuff Dam" comes from a pornographic magazine, titled Mad Fuck, that Ryder had read some years prior, and had decided to spell it backwards. Ryder saw it as an attempt to find his voice, something he felt was more important than trying to fit a story into a song. "Tart Tart" is partially inspired about a girl named Dinah that dealt drugs and would give Bez and Ryder a place to stay. A couple of lines address her death, which was the result of a brain hemorrhage. The song is also about the AIDS crisis that was occurring in the UK, and Martin Hannett's character. Despite Ryder having not met him, he learned about Hannett through Sumner, who would tell Ryder stories regarding him. "'Enery" tackles sexually-transmitted diseases, which the Ryder was aware of through his extended friendship group.

The drums in "Russell" recalled those heard in Movement-era (1981) New Order. The lyrics to it are taken verbatim from the blurb of Russell Grant's book Your Sun Signs. Whelan said Ryder saw the book while at the Boardwalk and started reading the back cover out loud. "Olive Oil" was compared to the work of fellow Manchester band the Smiths. Its title is inspired by a girl the band knew who had large eyes and feet. The jangly guitarwork in "Weekend S" is reminiscent of the indie scene of the time. Its name was shortened from the full title of "The Weekend Starts Here". The song is based on Ryder's outings to clubs and bars in Manchester in the early 1980s. Paul Ryder directly copied the bassline in "Got to Give It Up" (1977) by Marvin Gaye for "Little Matchstick Own". The song is named after Welsh boxer Johnny Owen.

"Oasis" originated from a jam session in Whelan's bedroom, and is named after a city market of the same name that his friend worked at. An earlier version it had previously appeared on the Forty Five EP two years prior with lyrics from "It's Not Unusual" (1965) by Tom Jones that were omitted for the album. "Desmond" has a similar melody to the one heard in "Ob-La-Di, Ob-La-Da" (1968) by the Beatles. The song is about the character "Eddie the Breakdancer"; Whelan disliked it as he felt the band did not perfect it in the studio. "24 Hour Party People" deals with people that are on the dole, who would prefer to party instead of looking for job opportunities. Shaun Ryder felt that with the song, he had found his voice in songwriting, being able to write about his life instead of what people expected him to write about. The intro to the closing track "Cob 20" evokes the sound of the Cure. Its title references a school friend of the Ryders' who would ride his sister's Raleigh Twenty bicycle.

Release
Happy Mondays started 1987 with two one-off shows in Manchester and London in January and February 1987, respectively. "Tart Tart" was released as the lead single from their forthcoming album on 12" vinyl, with "Little Matchstick Owen's Rap" as the B-side, in March 1987. The music video for "Tart Tart", filmed at Strawberry Studios, sees a close up of Ryder lip-synching, imposed over footage of the other members in Happy Mondays in wintery scenery. The band received national exposure for the first time when the video was played on Channel 4's The Chart Show. Squirrel and G-Man Twenty Four Hour Party People Plastic Face Carnt Smile (White Out) was released by Factory Records in mid-April 1987. Its initial vinyl release featured a removable PVC sleeve that had the band's name and the album's title on it in large bold letters. The cover itself featured an array of cakes and trifles, while the back cover consisted of a tray of fish. Iain Ellis of PopMatters said Central Station Design, who made the artwork, "introduce a spot-effects technique into the background", which evokes the work of Roy Lichtenstein.

The first 3,000 copies of Squirrel and G-Man Twenty Four Hour Party People Plastic Face Carnt Smile (White Out) were released with "Desmond", which received attention for the song's similarity to the aforementioned Beatles track. Factory received a writ from the lawyers of Michael Jackson, who owned the Beatles' song publishing. Saxe claimed they had received authorization for the melody over the phone; despite this, Factory promised to destroy all copies that contained the song, which did not come to fruition. Instead, they opted to draft in Young to quickly record the replacement track "24 Hour Party People" at Suite Sixteen Studios in Rochdale. Happy Mondays toured across the UK in April and May 1987, with a mixture of headlining shows, and supporting slots for the Fall, the Farm and the Weather Prophets.

Happy Mondays then supported New Order at an all-day benefit gig in London ran by Factory on 6 June 1987, and supported them again three days later in Glasgow. They flew to the United States to appear at a showcase gig, ran by Wilson, in New York City on 15 July 1989. It was being held in the midst of a city-wide music conference New Music Seminar in an attempt to secure licensing deals for the band's releases in North America. Alongside this, Factory released the sampler album Young, Popular & Sexy with "Kuff Dam", which was issued following New Order's commercial breakthrough in the US. The show went poorly, with various members falling ill to unknown substances; the equipment they hired for the event did not show up, and the gear they did find would not work properly. A handful of shows in headlining shows followed in July and August 1987.

"24 Hour Party People" was released as the second single from Squirrel and G-Man Twenty Four Hour Party People Plastic Face Carnt Smile (White Out) in October 1987, also on 12" vinyl, with "Yahoo" and "Wah Wah (Think Tank)" as its B-sides. Factory took on two film-makers, Keith Jobling and Phil Sotton, who went under the name The Bailey Brothers; they previously worked on videos for the Smiths' The Queen Is Dead (1986) album. Wilson saw Happy Mondays live with the duo, telling them that he wanted to make a music video for "24 Hour Party People". The Bailey Brothers were impressed with the band's performance, and dutifully signed up for the task. The duo filmed the band driving an Oldsmobile in  Ancoats; footage from the perspective of a passenger in the car was filmed later on. The single was promoted with a UK tour in the same month, marking their first headlining trek in the country. Happy Mondays closed the year with two shows at Warrington and Manchester in December 1987. Shows in 1988 were limited to four, specifically a supporting slot for Stump in February 1988, and three headlining shows in May 1988.

Reissues and related releases
Squirrel and G-Man Twenty Four Hour Party People Plastic Face Carnt Smile (White Out) was released on CD for the first time in 1990, and later reissued in 2000 through London Recordings. It was included Rhino Records' Original Album Series box set in 2013, which collected the band's first four studio albums. The album was re-pressed on vinyl in 2020. The "Tart Tart" and "24 Hour Party People" singles were reissued on vinyl in 2019 as part of the band's The Early EPs compilation. Following the death of Paul Ryder in July 2022, Whelan's brother Jase suggested that "Tart Tart" could be re-issued to honour Ryder. On 28 July 2022, "Tart Tart" was released as a single with the album version, a BBC session version and a live version as its B-sides. The profits from this were donated to MusiCares, an organization that helps people in the music industry that suffer from addiction.

"24 Hour Party People" appeared alone on Happy Mondays' first and third compilation albums Double Easy – The U.S. Singles (1993) and Greatest Hits (1999). "Kuff Dam", "Tart Tart" and "24 Hour Party People" were included on their second compilation album Loads (1995). "Tart Tart" and "24 Hour Party People" featured on the band's fourth compilation album The Platinum Collection (2005). "Olive Oil" and "24 Hour Party People" were included  on their fifth compilation album Double Double Good: The Best of Happy Mondays (2012).

Reception

Squirrel and G-Man Twenty Four Hour Party People Plastic Face Carnt Smile (White Out) was met with generally positive reviews from music critics. AllMusic reviewer Ned Raggett said Cale managed to "capture the cluttering mess" of Happy Mondays' "approach well enough". Sounds writer Ron Rom said that the album was "full of bitter disdain and sardonic, esoteric arrogance," with Cale's "unremarkable production" doing "little to cut through the gloom". He added that the band "hit hard, [...] and they rarely miss", topped by "[s]cruffy council estate vocals" from Shaun Ryder. The Observer John Savage called the album the "finest flowering to date" from any Manchester act.

Melody Maker reviewer Paul Mathur said Ryder's lyrics are a "source of haphazardly magical beauty, mixing bluntness and oblique suggestion with a certain shuffled cliche". Record Mirror writer Nancy Culp, on the other hand, said the lyrics "come across as the most bleak and hopeless this side of a Cure record". She added that "putting aside the fact that you feel like wrenching the damn record off after three tracks," it had "something curiously addictive" to it. Andy Darling of City Limits felt the songs would sound "great live", however, "on record it fails". For Trouser Press, Doug Brod and Michael Krugman called the album "unimaginative", stating it is "often unlistenable", with "no apparent flourishes" from Cale.

Squirrel and G-Man Twenty Four Hour Party People Plastic Face Carnt Smile (White Out) peaked at number four on the Independent Albums Chart in the UK. "Tart Tart" peaked at number 13 on the Independent Single Chart, while "24 Hour Party People" reached number ten. 10,000 copies of the album were pressed in total, though only 3,500 of them were sold within six months of its release. By this point, the Railway Children moved to Virgin Records and Miaow had broken up. Despite this, Wilson saw no commercial potential in Happy Mondays. At the end of 1987, the album had signed 5,000 copies. While the band had success in the press, it did not translate to sales, as Ryder explained: "I thought that [the positive attention from music publications] meant loads of money would come in, but it meant absolutely fuck all".

PopMatters included "24 Hour Party People" at number 92 on their list of The 100 Best Alternative Singles of the 1980s. The track would later lend its name to the film 24 Hour Party People (2002), which was a fictional retelling of the band's history, alongside Factory Records and its other acts. Remixes of "24 Hour Party People", done by Jon Carter, were released on 12" vinyl in May 2002 to coincide with the film; it charted in the UK at number 97.

Track listing
All tracks written by Happy Mondays. All recordings produced by John Cale.

Side one
 "Kuff Dam" – 3:06
 "Tart Tart" – 4:25
 "'Enery" – 2:22
 "Russell" – 4:53
 "Olive Oil" – 2:36

Side two
"Weekend S" – 2:23
 "Little Matchstick Owen" – 3:42
 "Oasis" – 3:45
 "24 Hour Party People" – 4:40
 "Cob 20" – 4:20

Notes
 The album was originally released without the track "24 Hour Party People". In its place was "Desmond", which borrowed heavily from "Ob-La-Di, Ob-La-Da" (1968) by the Beatles.
 "Little Matchstick Owen's Rap" is listed on the compact disc and cassette editions but does not appear on the release itself. The track can be found as the B-side to "Tart Tart".

Personnel
Personnel per sleeve.

Happy Mondays
 Shaun Ryder – vocals
 Paul Ryder – bass
 Mark Day – guitar
 Gary Whelan – drums
 Paul Davis – keyboards
 Mark "Bez" Berry – percussion

Production
 John Cale – producer
 Zuni – assistant engineer
 Andy Kelly – assistant engineer
 Dave Young – engineer
 Central Station Design – artwork

Charts

References
Citations

Sources

External links

 Squirrel and G-Man Twenty Four Hour Party People Plastic Face Carnt Smile (White Out) at YouTube (streamed copy where licensed)

1987 debut albums
Happy Mondays albums
Factory Records albums
Albums produced by John Cale
Dance-punk albums
Avant-pop albums